Samuel Nixon may refer to:

 Samuel F. Nixon (1848–1918), American theater owner
 Samuel A. Nixon (born 1958), American politician
 Samuel Nixon (artist)  (1804–1854), British sculptor
 Thomas Bayne (Sam Nixon) (1824–1888), American dentist and Virginia politician
 Sam Nixon (rugby union) (born 1996), English rugby union player

See also
Sam Nixon, English singer and television presenter